David Blair (4 June 1820 – 19 February 1899) was an Irish Australian politician, journalist and encyclopedist.

Background
David Blair was born in County Monaghan, Ireland to parents of Scottish descent. He studied at the Hibernian Military School, Dublin. He left in 1835, aged 15 years and worked in an uncle's business but did not enjoy it.

In 1840 he joined the Ordnance Survey of Ireland as a calculator stationed in Limerick and then Cork. He transferred to Southampton in 1841 and for almost nine years he worked on the triangulation of England and the survey of London.

Chartism
Blair was unsatisfied in his work, even speculating in 1848 on a military career, and found expression in supporting the Chartists as a lecturer in Southampton, in reading and in church activities.

Australia
He later studied for the ministry in Ireland and came to Australia in 1850 at the suggestion of  John Dunmore Lang, the intention being that he should go into the back country as a missionary. He took up journalism in Sydney, where he was associated with Henry Parkes on the Empire newspaper. Blair went to Victoria in 1852 and had a long and varied career as a journalist, including a long stint as leader writer for The Age and as a contributor to Victorian Review.

Blair was elected a member of the legislative assembly of Victoria in 1856 and again in 1868, but did not make any special mark in politics. In 1876 he edited the Speeches of Henry Parkes, and in 1878 or 1879 he published the important The History of Australasia--to the Establishment of Self-Government, based largely on the works of his predecessors, and Cyclopedia of Australasia (1881). He also wrote The First Imaginary Voyage to Australia (1882). He died at Melbourne on 19 February 1899, aged 78.

Family
Blair's daughter Florence Blair has been noted as a fine writer, having on occasion contributed articles for her father when he was indisposed. In September 1896 she replaced the dangerously ill Ida Wildman ("Sappho Smith") as editor of The Bulletin'''s Women's pages.

References

Sources

J. I. Roe, 'Blair, David (1820 - 1899)', Australian Dictionary of Biography, Volume 3, MUP, 1969, pp 179–180.
E. Morris Miller & Frederick T. Macartney (1956), Australian Literature'', Sydney, Angus & Robertson, p. 64.</ref>

Further reading
 

1820 births
1899 deaths
Politicians from County Monaghan
Chartists
Australian people of Scottish descent
Victoria (Australia) state politicians
Irish encyclopedists
Irish emigrants to colonial Australia
19th-century Australian journalists
19th-century Australian male writers
Australian encyclopedists
Australian male journalists